The prix Breizh is a French literary award bestowed under this name since 2001, on the initiative of Gwenn-Aël Bolloré. On that date, it succeeded the "Prix Bretagne" created in 1961. It crowns each year an author of Breton origin or friend of Brittany.

History 
The prix Breizh-prix Bretagne was founded in 1961 by Bretons of Paris, around Pascal Pondaven and Charles Le Quintrec, director and editor-in-chief of the weekly La Bretagne à Paris.

The Prix Bretagne today 
The Prix Bretagne, now under the patronage of Vincent Bolloré, celebrated its 50th anniversary in 2011. On this occasion, a monograph Prix Bretagne Prix Breizh 50 ans traced its history (list of laureates from 1961 to 2010, texts of the 12 members of the jury).

The spirit that presides over the awarding of the Prix Bretagne could be summed up by the introduction to his thanks by Kenneth White, the 2006 winner: 

"I must also say at once that I attach great importance to this prize. In awarding it, here at the Bibliothèque Nationale de France, to an extravagant Scotsman of my species, a Frenchman of adoption, a European of wit, the jury of the Brittany Prize clearly shows in my eyes his intention to remove Brittany from all the confinements with which it has suffered, and to extricate Celtic culture from all the ignoble or malicious caricatures of which it has been the victim."

In 2013, the Prix Bretagne was awarded a sum of 6100 €.

Jury 
In its early days, the Prix Breizh-Prix Bretagne included writers such as Roger Nimier, Hervé Bazin, Paul Guimard, Henri Queffélec, Jean Marin.

Composition of the 2012 jury:
 President, Philippe Le Guillou
 General secretary, Jean Bothorel
 Members : Annick Cojean, Stéphanie Janicot, Georges-Olivier Châteaureynaud, Jean-François Coatmeur, Georges Guitton, Sébastien Le Fol, Patrick Mahé, Gilles Martin-Chauffier, Jean Picollec, Patrick Poivre d’Arvor.

Laureates

References 

Breizh
Awards established in 1961
1961 establishments in France